Somme Barracks could refer to:
Somme Barracks, Sheffield in Sheffield, England
Somme Barracks, Blackburn in Blackburn, England
Somme Barracks, Shepparton in Shepparton, Australia
Somme Barracks, Catterick Garrison